The 2008–09 Barangay Ginebra Kings season was the 30th season of the franchise in the Philippine Basketball Association (PBA). The head coach for the season was Jong Uichico, and Eric Menk, David Noel, Ronald Tubid, Jayjay Helterbrand, and Paul Artadi played the starting lineup. The Kings finished third in the Philippine Cup. The Kings also added Junjun Cabatu as afree agent–before playing for the Kings, he played for the Alaska Aces.

Key dates
August 30: The 2008 PBA Draft took place in Fort Bonifacio, Taguig.
September 1: The free agency period started.

Draft picks

Roster

Depth chart

Philippine Cup

Eliminations

Standings

Game log

|- bgcolor="#bbffbb"
| 1
| October 8
| Sta. Lucia
| 89-86
| Helterbrand (26)
| Menk (11)
| Helterbrand, Artadi (3)
| Araneta Coliseum
| 1–0
|- bgcolor="#bbffbb"
| 2
| October 12
| Air21
| 101-92
| Cabatu (23)
| Artadi (7) 
| Artadi (7)
| Araneta Coliseum
| 2–0
|- bgcolor="#edbebf"
| 3
| October 19
| Red Bull
| 94–100
| Helterbrand (22)
| Menk (10)
| Artadi (5)
| Araneta Coliseum
| 2–1
|- bgcolor="#edbebf"
| 4
| October 22
| San Miguel
| 89–118
| Helterbrand (15)
| Crisano (8)
| Artadi (5)
| Araneta Coliseum
| 2–2
|- bgcolor="#edbebf"
| 5
| October 26
| Purefoods
| 81–92
| Salvacion (17)
| Menk (10)
| Helterbrand, Artadi (4)
| Araneta Coliseum
| 2–3

|- bgcolor="#edbebf"
| 6
| November 2
| Alaska
| 84–93
| Helterbrand (30)
| Wilson (18)
| Artadi (6)
| Araneta Coliseum
| 2–4
|- bgcolor="#edbebf"
| 7
| November 5
| Rain or Shine
| 102–106
| Menk (24)
| Menk (12)
| Helterbrand (6) 
| Araneta Coliseum
| 2–5
|- bgcolor="#bbffbb"
| 8
| November 8
| Coca-Cola
| 81-77
| Helterbrand (28) 
| Pacana (10)
| Helterbrand (4)
| Lucena City
| 3–5
|- bgcolor="#edbebf"
| 9
| November 12
| Talk 'N Text
| 90–103
| Tubid (17) 
| Salvacion, Tubid (9)
| Helterbrand (5)
| Cuneta Astrodome
| 3–6
|-bgcolor="#bbffbb"
| 10
| November 16
| Purefoods
| 90-80
| Helterbrand (23)
| Menk (12)
| Helterbrand (8)
| Cuneta Astrodome
| 4–6
|-bgcolor="#bbffbb"
| 11
| November 22
| Sta. Lucia
| 93-81
| Salvacion (22)
| Wilson, Menk (9)
| Artadi (8)
| San Juan Arena
| 5–6
|-bgcolor="#bbffbb"
| 12
| November 27
| Coca-Cola
| 84-77
| Tubid (22)
| Tubid (10)
| Artadi (4)
| Olivarez College Gym
| 6–6

|-bgcolor="#bbffbb"
| 13
| December 3
| Red Bull
| 83-76
| Tubid, Salvacion (15)
| Tubid (11)
| Artadi (6)
| Araneta Coliseum
| 7–6
|-bgcolor="#edbebf"
| 14
| December 5
| Air21
| 102-84
| Mamaril, Crisano (15)
| Tubid (10)
| Artadi (4)
| Araneta Coliseum
| 7–7
|-bgcolor="#bbffbb"
| 15
| December 13
| Alaska
| 84-82
| Menk (17)
| Menk (11)
| Helterbrand (6)
| Cagayan de Oro
| 8–7
|-bgcolor="#edbebf"
| 16
| December 17
| Talk 'N Text
| 85–109
| Mamaril (17)
| Menk (10)
| Helterbrand, Artadi (4)
| Araneta Coliseum
| 8–8
|-bgcolor="#bbffbb"
| 17
| December 20
| San Miguel
| 87-82
| Helterbrand (35)
| 
| 
| Batangas City
| 9–8
|-bgcolor="bbffbb"
| 18
| December 25
| Rain or Shine
| 63-58
| Menk (15)
| 
| 
| Araneta Coliseum
| 10–8

Fiesta Conference

Eliminations

Standings

Game log

|- bgcolor="#bbffbb"
| 1
| March 4
| Coca Cola
| 110-103
| Nealy (42)
| Nealy (23)
| Nealy (9)
| Ynares Center
| 1–0
|- bgcolor="#edbebf"
| 2
| March 6
| Burger King
| 106–110
| Nealy (26)
| Nealy (20)
| Helterbrand (6)
| Cuneta Astrodome
| 1–1
|- bgcolor="#edbebf"
| 3
| March 11
| Sta. Lucia
| 76–80
| Nealy (18)
| Nealy (14)
| Nealy (5)
| Cuneta Astrodome
| 1–2
|- bgcolor="#edbebf"
| 4
| March 18
| Rain or Shine
| 93–107
| Nealy (32)
| Nealy (11)
| Helterbrand (7)
| Araneta Coliseum
| 1–3
|- bgcolor="#edbebf"
| 5
| March 20
| Alaska Aces
| 82-81
| Nealy (23)
| Nealy, Wilson (12)
| Helterbrand (7)
| Araneta Coliseum
| 1–4
|- bgcolor="#edbebf"
| 6
| March 25
| San Miguel
| 85–90
| Helterbrand (24)
| Nealy (15)
| Nealy (6)
| Araneta Coliseum
| 1–5
|- bgcolor="#bbffbb"
| 7
| March 28
| Barako Bull
| 111-103
| Nealy, Tubid (29)
| Nealy (17)
| Nealy (6)
| Panabo City Sports Center
| 2–5

|- bgcolor="#bbffbb"
| 8
| April 17
| Rain or Shine
| 94-89
| Menk (24) 
| Menk (9) 
| Helterbrand (9)
| Araneta Coliseum
| 3–5
|- bgcolor="#bbffbb"
| 9
| April 20
| Burger King
| 100-94
| Noel, Menk (22) 
| Noel (17)
| Noel (10)
| Cuneta Astrodome
| 4–5

|-bgcolor="#bbffbb"
| 10
| May 1
| Talk 'N Text
| 90–97
| Noel (21)
| Noel (19)
| Noel (7)
| Araneta Coliseum
| 5–5
|-bgcolor="#bbffbb"
| 11
| May 8
| Sta. Lucia
| 101-98
| Noel (23)
| Noel (12)
| Helterbrand (6)
| Ynares Center
| 6–5
|-bgcolor="#bbffbb"
| 12
| May 10
| Purefoods
| 116-109
| Noel (30)
| Noel (11)
| Noel (7)
| Araneta Coliseum
| 7–5
|-bgcolor="#bbffbb"
| 13
| May 20
| Coca Cola
| 112-85
| Tubid (20)
| Noel (18)
| Noel (5)
| Araneta Coliseum
| 8–5
|- bgcolor="#edbebf"
| 14
| May 22
| Alaska
| 75–76
| Helterbrand (18)
| Noel (21)
| Noel (6)
| Araneta Coliseum
| 8–6

Playoffs

|- bgcolor="#bbffbb"
| 1
| May 24
| Rain or Shine
| 114-71
| Tubid (18)
| Reavis (8)
| Helterbrand (4)
| Ynares Center
| n/a

|- bgcolor="#edbebf"
| 1
| June 17
| Rain or Shine
| 95–101
| Tubid (21)
| Noel (9)
| Helterbrand (7)
| Araneta Coliseum
| 0–1
|- bgcolor="#bbffbb"
| 2
| June 19
| Rain or Shine
| 103-98
| Helterbrand (34)
| Noel (8)
| Noel (6)
| Cuneta Astrodome
| 1–1
|- bgcolor="#edbebf"
| 3
| June 21
| Rain or Shine
| 88–94
| Helterbrand (17)
| Noel (17)
| Helterbrand (6)
| Araneta Coliseum
| 1–2
|- bgcolor="#bbffbb"
| 4
| June 24
| Rain or Shine
| 86-70
| Noel (28)
| Noel (17)
| Helterbrand (3)
| Araneta Coliseum
| 2–2
|- bgcolor="#bbffbb"
| 5
| June 26
| Rain or Shine
| 96-85
| Helterbrand (21)
| Noel (10)
| Noel (6)
| Araneta Coliseum
| 3–2
|- bgcolor="#bbffbb"
| 6
| June 28
| Rain or Shine
| 108-100
| Noel, Tubid (23)
| Noel, Tubid (10)
| Noel (7)
| Araneta Coliseum
| 4–2

|- bgcolor="#bbffbb"
| 1
| July 1
| San Miguel
| 102-96
| Helterbrand (21)
| Noel (8)
| Helterbrand (7)
| Araneta Coliseum
| 1–0
|- bgcolor="#edbebf"
| 2
| July 3
| San Miguel
| 78–95
| Noel (20)
| Noel (8)
| Helterbrand (4)
| Araneta Coliseum
| 1–1
|- bgcolor="#bbffbb"
| 3
| July 5
| San Miguel
| 116-103
| Noel (32)
| Noel (10)
| Noel (11)
| Araneta Coliseum
| 2–1
|- bgcolor="#edbebf"
| 4
| July 8
| San Miguel
| 104–106
| Helterbrand, Noel (22)
| Noel (18)
| Helterbrand (6)
| Araneta Coliseum
| 2–2
|- bgcolor="#bbffbb"
| 5
| July 13
| San Miguel
| 106-98
| Noel (29)
| Noel (11)
| Helterbrand, Noel (4)
| Araneta Coliseum
| 3–2
|- bgcolor="#edbebf"
| 6
| July 15
| San Miguel
| 84–98
| Noel (16)
| Noel (11)
| Noel (7)
| Araneta Coliseum
| 3–3
|- bgcolor="#edbebf"
| 7
| July 17
| San Miguel
| 79–90
| Helterbrand (25)
| Noel (15)
| Helterbrand (7)
| Araneta Coliseum
| 3–4

Statistics

Philippine Cup
Player Stats as of January 29, 2008. 5:30 p.m. PHI Time

Awards and records

Awards

Records
Note: Barangay Ginebra Kings Records Only

Transactions

Trades

{| cellspacing="0"
| valign="top" |

Free Agents

Additions

References

Barangay Ginebra San Miguel seasons
Barangay Ginebra